The 2014 United States Senate election in South Dakota took place on November 4, 2014, to elect a member of the United States Senate to represent the state of South Dakota, concurrently with the election of the Governor of South Dakota, as well as other elections to the United States Senate in other states and elections to the United States House of Representatives and various state and local elections.

Incumbent Democratic Senator Tim Johnson decided to retire instead of running for re-election to a fourth term in office. As a result, this was the first open seat election since 1978. With Mike Rounds' election, Republicans held both of South Dakota's Senate seats for the first time since 1987 and gave South Dakota an all-GOP congressional delegation for the first time since 1963.

Businessman Rick Weiland ran unopposed for the Democratic nomination, while the Republicans picked former Governor of South Dakota Mike Rounds. Also running were two independent candidates: former Republican U.S. Senator Larry Pressler, who served three terms in the Senate from 1979 to 1997, and former Republican state senator Gordon Howie.

Democratic primary

Candidates

Declared 
 Rick Weiland, businessman, former staffer for Tom Daschle, nominee for South Dakota's at-large congressional district (SD-AL) in 1996 and candidate for SD-AL in 2002

Withdrew 
 Kevin Artz, businessman
 Henry Jo Sinkie, rancher and resort owner

Declined 
 Jason Frerichs, Minority Leader of the South Dakota Senate (running for re-election)
 Stephanie Herseth Sandlin, former U.S. Representative
 Brendan Johnson, United States Attorney for the District of South Dakota and son of incumbent senator Tim Johnson
 Tim Johnson, incumbent U.S. Senator
 Pat O'Brien, author, television anchor and radio host
 Ron J. Volesky, attorney and former state senator

Endorsements

Polling

Results 
Weiland faced no opposition in the Democratic primary.

Republican primary

Candidates

Declared 
 Annette Bosworth, physician
 Stace Nelson, state representative
 Jason Ravnsborg, attorney
 Larry Rhoden, Majority Whip of the South Dakota Senate
 Mike Rounds, former Governor of South Dakota

Declined 
 Steve T. Kirby, former Lieutenant Governor of South Dakota and candidate for governor in 2002
 William Napoli, former state senator
 Kristi Noem, U.S. Representative
 Mark Venner, former state representative

Endorsements

Polling

Results

Independents and Third Parties

Candidates

Declared 
 Gordon Howie (Independent), former Republican state senator and Republican candidate for Governor in 2010
 Larry Pressler (Independent), former Republican U.S. Senator

Disqualified 
 Clayton Walker (Independent), small business consultant and Democratic candidate for state representative in 2010

Withdrew 
 Kurt Evans (Libertarian), teacher and nominee for the U.S. Senate in 2002

General election

Campaign 
Rounds was widely seen as the front runner throughout the campaign. However, he faced ongoing criticism on the election trail for his possible involvement with the State's ongoing EB-5 visa investigation, concerning the conflict of interest that Rounds' administration had when administering the EB-5 program. State officials misused funds to pay for their salaries, did not disclose that they owned companies which they gave contracts to, directed money towards companies that went bankrupt and arranged for loans from unknown sources from shell companies located in tax havens. In October 2014, Rounds admitted that he had approved a $1 million state loan to meat-packing company Northern Beef shortly after learning that Secretary of Tourism and State Development Richard Benda had agreed to join the company, with Benda then getting another $600,000 in loans that was ultimately used to pay his own salary. Benda committed suicide in October 2013, days before a possible indictment over embezzlement and grand theft charges.

Columnist Jonathan Ellis of the Argus Leader called Rounds' fundraising "anemic" compared to the amount of outside money coming into the state on Weiland's side, and criticized the entire Rounds campaign as "more suited for sheriff of Mayberry County than U.S. Senate."

Debates 
 Complete video of debate, October 29, 2014

Predictions

Polling 

With Herseth Sandlin

With B. Johnson

With T. Johnson

With Weiland

 * Internal polling for the Mike Rounds campaign
 ^ Internal polling for the Rick Weiland campaign

Results

Maps

See also 

 2014 South Dakota gubernatorial election
 2014 United States House of Representatives election in South Dakota
 2014 United States Senate elections
 2014 United States elections

References

External links 
 U.S. Senate elections in South_Dakota, 2014 at Ballotpedia
 Campaign contributions at OpenSecrets

Official campaign websites (Archived)
 Mike Rounds for U.S. Senate
 Rick Weiland for U.S. Senate
 Larry Pressler for U.S. Senate
 Gordon Howie for U.S. Senate

2014
South Dakota
United States Senate